This is a list of Italian EU protected geographical indications as defined in the Council of the European Union Regulation CE 510/2006, which fall into three schemes.

 138 Italian products have Protected designation of origin (PDO) or D.O.P.
 83 Italian products have Protected geographical indication (PGI) or I.G.P.
 2 Italian products are Traditional specialty guaranteed (TSG). They are: mozzarella and pizza napoletana

To which they must be added:
 39 Italian products have Geographical indication (GI) or I.G.

PDO, PGI, TSG

Sources: Official data of the Italian Ministry of Agriculture updated on 15 February 2011 and of the Quality schemes explained on the Europa.eu website.
of

GI
List of GI products, pursuant to Annex III of the Legislative Resolution of the European Parliament n ° P6-TA-2007-0259 of 19 June 2007 "on the proposal for a Regulation of the European Parliament and of the Council relating to the definition, designation, presentation and labeling of alcoholic drinks", updated 22 July 2014:

See also

 Appellation
 Country of origin
 European Union Common Agricultural Policy
 Genericized trademark
 Geographical indication
 Italian cuisine
 Italian wines
 List of geographical designations for spirit drinks in the European Union
 List of Italian cheeses
 List of Italian DOC wines
 List of Italian DOCG wines
 Protected Geographical Status
 Quality Wines Produced in Specified Regions (QWPSR)
 Strada dell'Olio

References

External links
 Agriculture Policy Area, European Union
 Official List of Italian Protected Products as defined by the Ministero delle Politiche Agricole, Alimentari e Forestali - July 2013
 EU Food Quality website with access to PDO,PGI,TSG listings, europa.eu
 Defra - EU Protected Food Names Scheme. defra.gov.uk
 Ministero Politiche agricole, alimentari e forestali in Italian

 
Protected designation of origin